is a Japanese footballer who plays for Tochigi City FC as a left back.

Club career
Suzuki began his career in the academy at Marysol Matsushima, before transferring to the youth setup at J League side Kashima Antlers in April 2009. He made his first team debut on 10 October 2012, in a 2–1 win over Gainare Tottori in the third round of the Emperor's Cup. In July 2013, Suzuki joined Division 2 side JEF United Chiba on a half-year loan deal. He made his league debut on 18 August 2013, in a 3–2 defeat to Matsumoto Yamaga, coming on as a substitute for Shunki Takahashi.

International career
Suzuki has represented Japan at under-17, under-19 and under-20 levels. He played for the under-17's in 2011 FIFA U-17 World Cup, making two starts as the Japan reached the Quarterfinals.

Club statistics
Updated to 23 February 2017.

References

External links

 Profile at Ehime FC
 Profile at Eurosport
 
 

1994 births
Living people
Association football people from Miyagi Prefecture
Japanese footballers
Japan youth international footballers
J1 League players
J2 League players
Kashima Antlers players
JEF United Chiba players
Tochigi SC players
Ehime FC players
Tochigi City FC players
Association football fullbacks